Chesterfield County Airport  is a public airport located 10 miles (16 km) southwest of the central business district of Richmond, Virginia, United States, in unincorporated Chesterfield County. It is owned by Chesterfield County.

Although most U.S. airports use the same three-letter location identifier for the FAA and IATA, Chesterfield County Airport is assigned FCI by the FAA but has no designation from the IATA.

Facilities and aircraft 
Built in 1973, Chesterfield County Airport covers an area of  ,which contains one asphalt paved runway (15/33) measuring 5,500 x 100 ft (1,676 x 30 m). The runway was completely resurfaced in 2007 and repainted in 2008.

Chesterfield County Airport is designated by the FAA as an official general aviation reliever airport for the busier Richmond International Airport. The modern terminal building has internet access, Wi-Fi, flight planning room, showers, vending machines, restaurant, and pilot quiet rooms. 

Dominion Aviation Services is the fixed-base operator (FBO) at this field. Fuel, flight training, and aircraft rental are available. Dominion is an FAA certified repair station.  

Chesterfield County Airport is the home base of the Wingnuts Flying Club.

The airport is the second busiest in the Richmond region. For the 12-month period ending December 31, 2006, the airport had 82,500 aircraft operations, an average of 226 per day: 99% general aviation, 1% air taxi and <1% military.

There are 137 aircraft based at this airport: 75% single engine, 15% multi-engine, 7% jets and 3% helicopters.

Public safety and military 
Chesterfield County Airport home to part of the Virginia State Police Med-Flight Program and serves as an aviation support facility annex for the Virginia Army National Guard 224th Aviation Regiment. The state police currently has two fixed-wing aircraft and two helicopters based out of their aviation division hangar.

References 

5. Richmond Executive Aviation

External links 

Airports in Virginia
Buildings and structures in Chesterfield County, Virginia
Transportation in Chesterfield County, Virginia
Airports established in 1973
1973 establishments in Virginia